Flindersia oppositifolia, commonly known as mountain silkwood, is a species of tree that is endemic to the Bellenden Ker Range in northern Queensland. It has simple leaves arranged more or less in opposite pairs, dark reddish flowers arranged in panicles, and fruit studded with short, rough points.

Description

Taxonomy
Mountain silkwood was first formally described in 1892 by Ferdinand von Mueller who gave it the name Hypsophila oppositifolia and published the description in The Victorian Naturalist from material collected on Mount Bartle Frere. In 1982, Thomas Hartley and Laurence Jessup changed the name to Flindersia oppositifolia in the journal Brunonia.

Distribution and habitat

Conservation status
Flindersia oppositifolia is classified as of "least concern" under the Queensland Government Nature Conservation Act 1992.

References

oppositifolia
Flora of Queensland
Sapindales of Australia
Trees of Australia
Plants described in 1892
Taxa named by Ferdinand von Mueller